Claude Kayat (born 24 July 1939, Sfax, Tunisia) is a Franco-Swedish writer, dramatist and painter. Since 1958, he lives in Stockholm, Sweden, where he completed his studies; He got married, had children, and worked as a teacher of French and English.

At the same time, he pursued a career as a novelist in French, a language he has always considered his mother tongue without ever having lived in the country.

In his writing Claude Kayat often explores concepts like identity. He has also written 28 plays in French and Swedish.

Bibliography 
1981: Mohammed Cohen, Éditions du Seuil, prix Afrique méditerranéenne 1982
1987: Les Cyprès de Tibériade, La Table Ronde, Grand prix du Rayonnement de la langue française
1989: Le Rêve d’Esther, La Table Ronde
1997: L'Armurier, Le Seuil, prix Ève Delacroix of the Académie française
2000: Hitler tout craché, L’Âge d’Homme
2002: Le Treizième Disciple, 
2007: La Synagogue de Sfax, Punctum
2012: Le Café de Mme Ben Djamil
 2019: La Paria

Exhibitions 
 2008: Galerie Paname, Stockholm 
 2009: Håfors Galerie
 2009: Cosmopolitan Galleri, Göteborg
 2010: Rönnells, Stockholm
 2011: Chaikhana, Stockholm

External links 
 Writings by Claude Kayat
 Albert Bensoussan : La synagogue de Sfax par Claude Kayat
 Claude Kayat on the site of the Académie française
  Claude Kayat on Éditions Léo Sheer
 La corvée des ordures on Sens public

21st-century French non-fiction writers
1939 births
People from Sfax
20th-century French dramatists and playwrights
20th-century Swedish dramatists and playwrights
Living people
 Swedish people of French descent
Tunisian emigrants to Sweden
Swedish male dramatists and playwrights